An Olympic-size swimming pool conforms to regulated dimensions that are large enough for international competition. If touch panels are used in competition, then the distance between touch panels should be either 25 or 50 metres to qualify for FINA recognition. This means that Olympic pools are generally oversized, to accommodate touch panels used in competition.

An Olympic-size swimming pool is used as a colloquial unit of volume, to make approximate comparisons to similarly sized objects or volumes. It is not a specific definition, as there is no official limit on the depth of an Olympic pool. The value has an order of magnitude of 1 megaliter (ML).

Specifications
FINA specifications for an Olympic-size pool are as follows:

The length of  must be between the touch pads at the end of each lane, if they are used.

At FINA's 2009 Congress, rules were approved for 10-lane courses for competition, as an alternative to the more traditional 8-lane course.

History
This version of the Olympic-sized swimming pool debuted in the 2008 Beijing Summer Olympics. Beforehand, the Summer Olympics featured the more traditional 8-lane course with a depth of roughly seven feet, now the minimum depth requirement. Twenty-five world records were broken at this pool.

Advantages
The new Olympic-sized swimming pool was designed to provide advantages to competitors. Increasing the lane count from eight to ten introduces a "buffer lane", helping to absorb waves generated by movements of the swimmers. The increased depth of the pool assists the lane lines in dissipating water churn, thereby creating less hydrodynamic drag.

See also
 Sport venue
 List of long course swimming pools in the United Kingdom
 List of long course swimming pools in the Republic of Ireland
 List of Olympic-size swimming pools in the Philippines
 List of largest swimming pools
 List of Olympic venues in swimming

References

Swimming at the Summer Olympics